Pia Vogel (born 8 January 1969 in Sursee) is a Swiss rower. Along with Kim Plugge she finished 5th in the women's lightweight double sculls at the 2000 Summer Olympics.

References 
 
 

1969 births
Living people
People from Sursee District
Swiss female rowers
Olympic rowers of Switzerland
Rowers at the 2000 Summer Olympics
World Rowing Championships medalists for Switzerland
Sportspeople from the canton of Lucerne
20th-century Swiss women